Irish Pictorial Weekly is an Irish satirical television series which was broadcast on Raidió Teilifís Éireann starting in November 2012.
Series 2 of the show started on 21 November 2013 and was renewed for a third season which began airing on 22 March 2015. On March 30, 2016, the show returned for a one-off special, "focussing on the 1916 centenary celebrations and... on what Ireland has done with its independence in the last 100 years" since the 1916 Easter Rising.

The show features satirical sketches on current news stories and popular culture, as well as parody songs, comedy sketches, re-edited videos, cartoons and spoof television formats. Comedians performing on the show include Barry Murphy, Gary Cooke, Paul Howard, John Colleary, Paul Woodful, Colum McDonnell, Alan Shortt, Eleanor Tiernan, Tara Flynn and Abie Philbin Bowman.

References

External links
Irish Pictorial Weekly at RTÉ.ie
Irish Pictorial Weekly at IMDb

2012 Irish television series debuts
Cultural depictions of Taoisigh
Irish television sketch shows
RTÉ original programming
2010s satirical television series